Daniel Kelley may refer to:

Daniel E. Kelley (1843–1905), musician
Daniel Kelley (hacker), British computer hacker
Danny Kelley (born 1964), stock car racer
Dan Kelley (born 1970), former Iowa State Representative

See also
Daniel Kelly (disambiguation)